Pietro Fontanini (born 23 September 1952) is an Italian politician from the Lega Nord, current Mayor of Udine and former President of Friuli-Venezia Giulia.

Biography 
Graduated in Sociology, Fontanini joined the Lega Nord after having spent a few years in the Italian Communist Party in Friuli. Once elected to the regional council of Friuli-Venezia Giulia, Fontanini is appointed President of Friuli-Venezia Giulia for the first five months of the legislature.

He left his seat in the regional council in order to run for the Senate at the 1994 general election, resulting in his election. He is later elected to the Chamber of Deputies at the 1996 and the 2001 general election.

In 1995, Fontanini is elected Mayor of Campoformido, in the province of Udine, and held the seat for two consecutive terms until 2004.

In 2008, he is elected President of the province of Udine, being later re-elected in 2013. He left the office a few months before the end of his second term in order to run for the office of Mayor of Udine at the 2018 local election: Fontanini is elected at the runoff.

References

External links 
Files about his parliamentary activities (in Italian): XII, XIII, XIV, legislature

1952 births
Living people
People from Udine
Lega Nord politicians
20th-century Italian politicians
21st-century Italian politicians
Mayors of Udine